Yichang East railway station, formerly Huayan railway station, is a railway station  in Yichang City, Hubei Province, China. It is the junction of two sections of the Shanghai–Wuhan–Chengdu high-speed railway (Huhanrong): the  Hanyi Railway, going east to Hankou (Wuhan), and the Yiwan Railway going west to Lichuan and Wanzhou. The Hanyi Railway is operated by the Wuhan Railway Bureau.

Service
As of 2012, Yichang East railway station is the main railway station for the Yichang Metropolitan area. It is the western terminal for the frequent high-speed D-series train service from Yichang to Wuhan and points east (Nanchang, Shanghai). Most of other passenger service originating in Yichang  or passing through it uses Yichang East as well.

History
The construction of the station started in January  2005.

Some trains, such as the Yichang-Beijing West service,  already started serving Yichang East Station (instead of the older Yichang Station in downtown Yichang) as of December 23, 2010. Construction work, however,  continued into 2011.

Nearby stations
The old Yichang railway station, in downtown Yichang. Opened in 1971, it was the main (and only) passenger station in Yichang area until the opening of the Yichang East railway station in 2010. After that, services at Yichang railway station were gradually reduced, and in October 2012 it was closed for reconstruction.

References

Railway stations in Hubei
Yichang